Scaptesyle is a genus of moths in the subfamily Arctiinae first described by Francis Walker in 1854.

Description
Palpi upturned reaching vertex of head. Antennae of male minutely ciliated. Tibia with long spurs. Forewings with stalked veins 4 and 5, vein 6 from below angle of cell and stalked veins 7,8 and 9. Hindwings with stalked veins 3,4 and 6,7. Vein 5 from above angle of cell and vein 8 from middle of cell.

Species
 Scaptesyle aurigena Walker, 1863
 Scaptesyle buergersi Gaede, 1926
 Scaptesyle bicolor Walker, 1864
 Scaptesyle bifasciata Snellen, 1904
 Scaptesyle bipartita Rothschild, 1913
 Scaptesyle bizone Rothschild, 1912
 Scaptesyle dichotoma Meyrick, 1886
 Scaptesyle dictyota Meyrick, 1886
 Scaptesyle equidistans Lucas, 1890
 Scaptesyle fovealis Hampson, 1903
 Scaptesyle ixias Hampson, 1900
 Scaptesyle luzonica Swinhoe, 1916
 Scaptesyle middletoni (Turner, 1941)
 Scaptesyle mirabilis Hampson, 1900
 Scaptesyle monogrammaria Walker, 1862
 Scaptesyle plumosus Rothschild, 1912
 Scaptesyle sororigena Holloway, 2001
 Scaptesyle subtricolor van Eecke, 1927
 Scaptesyle tetramita Turner, 1940
 Scaptesyle thestias Snellen, 1904
 Scaptesyle tricolor Walker, 1854
 Scaptesyle violinitens Rothschild, 1912

Former species
 Scaptesyle aroa Bethune-Baker, 1904
 Scaptesyle incerta Semper, 1899
 Scaptesyle pseudoblabia Hampson, 1918
 Scaptesyle rothschildi Draudt, 1914

References

Lithosiini
Moth genera